Mount Achilles may refer to:

Mount Achilles (Tasmania), Australia
Mount Achilles (Palmer Archipelago), Antarctica
Mount Achilles in the Admiralty Mountains, Antarctica
Mount Achilles in the Two Thumb Range, New Zealand